HMS Blandford was a member of the 1719 Establishment Group of 20-gun sixth rates. After commissioning she spent her career in Home Waters, the Baltic, North America and the Mediterranean on trade protection duties. She was sold at Deptford in October 1742.

Blandford was the second named vessel since it was used for a 24-gun sixth rate launched at Woolwich on 29 October 1711 and lost with all hands in the Bay of Biscay on 23 March 1719.

Construction
She was ordered on 4 July 1719 from Deptford Dockyard to be built under the guidance of Richard Stacey, Master Shipwright of Deptford. She was launched on 13 February 1720. She was completed for sea on 4 March 1720 at a cost of 3,041.11.3d plus 480.0.83/4 for fitting.

Commissioned service
She was commissioned in 1720 under the command of Captain William Martin, RN for service in the Baltic then to Carolina from 1721 to 24. She under the command of Captain George Protheroe, RN in 1727 for service in the Mediterranean in 1728 then she moved to New England in 1730/31. She returned home and paid off in July 1732. She was underwent a great repair at Sheerness from September 1732 to February 1733 at a cost of £1,872.1.9d. She was under the command of Captain George Burrish, RN for service in the North Sea in May 1732, She went to the Portuguese coast in 1734, then back to the English Channel in 1735 on to Georgia in 1738 and Jamaica 1739–40. She sailed for home with dispatches on 1 September 1740. She was surveyed in December 1740.

Disposition
HMS Blandford was lost with all hands during a storm in the Bay of Biscay on 23 March 1719.

Notes

Citations

References
 Winfield 2007, British Warships in the Age of Sail (1714 – 1792), by Rif Winfield, published by Seaforth Publishing, England © 2007, EPUB , Chapter 6, Sixth Rates, Sixth Rates of 20 or 24 guns, Vessels acquired after 1 August 1714, 1719 Establishment Group, Blandford
 Colledge, Ships of the Royal Navy, by J.J. Colledge, revised and updated by Lt Cdr Ben Warlow and Steve Bush, published by Seaforth Publishing, Barnsley, Great Britain, © 2020, EPUB , (EPUB), Section B (Blandford)

 

Corvettes of the Royal Navy
Ships built in Deptford
Naval ships of the United Kingdom
1720s ships